State Farm Insurance is a group of mutual insurance companies throughout the United States with corporate headquarters in Bloomington, Illinois. Founded in 1922, it is the largest property, casualty, and auto insurance provider in the United States.

Overview 

State Farm is the largest property and casualty insurance provider, and the largest auto insurance provider, in the United States.
State Farm is ranked 42nd in the 2022 Fortune 500, which lists American companies by revenue.

State Farm relies on exclusive agents (also known as captive agents) to sell insurance. Only State Farm agents can sell State Farm insurance, and their agents can sell only State Farm products.

Financial services 

State Farm has expanded into the financial services arena, such as banking and mutual funds.

The bank opened in May 1999 and is operated by State Farm Financial Services, FSB, a subsidiary of State Farm Mutual Automobile Insurance Co. These are separate from its insurance products. State Farm Bank does not have branch offices. Its regular banking services, which include checking and savings accounts, certificates of deposit, and money market accounts, are available to consumers countrywide via the Internet or over the phone, and through agents. Home mortgages are available countrywide over the phone or through agents.

In the 1950s, State Farm held a contest among the agents, to come up with ideas to expand the State Farm business. Robert H. Kent, a State Farm agent in Chicago, came up with the idea of providing auto loans to existing policyholders. Robert H. Kent was friends with a local bank president at LaSalle NW, and the two teamed up to pilot the auto finance program. State Farm liked the idea so much that it was rolled out to all the agents. Robert H. Kent received royalties on the program for 20 years. This event created the first marketing partnership between insurance companies and banks.

History 

State Farm was founded in June 1922 by retired farmer George J. Mecherle as a mutual automobile insurance company owned by its policyholders. The firm specialized in auto insurance for farmers and offered better rates than rival companies, which must also cover expensive premiums of the urban motorists. It later expanded services into other types of insurance, such as homeowners and life insurance, and then to banking and financial services.

As of December 2017, State Farm had 70,000 employees and 19,000 agents. February 2014 figures show the group servicing 80 million policies in the United States and Canada, of which over 44,000,000 are for automobiles, 27,000,000 are for fire, 7,000,000 for life, and more than 2 million bank accounts.

Michael L. Tipsord is chairman and CEO of State Farm Mutual Automobile Insurance Company, and president and chief executive officer of State Farm Fire and Casualty Company, State Farm Life Insurance Company, and other principal State Farm affiliates.

By 2017, State Farms announced its plan to exit 11 facilities in America with the goal of streamlining and improving processes. In 2014, it already sold its operations in Canada to Desjardins Group, which continued to use the State Farm name. Canadian policies were transferred to be underwritten by Desjardins Group on January 1, 2015. The State Farm brand continued to be used for agents and marketing until 2018.  In 2018, State Farm Canada was officially rebranded to Desjardins Insurance through Desjardins Insurance Agents. The whole transition was completed in 2019.

Logo 

The State Farm interlocked red tri-oval logo was created in the mid-to-late 1940s and later updated in 1953. For nearly 60 years, this design was critical to its brand image.

On December 23, 2011, State Farm decided to transform its interlocked tri-oval logo to a contemporary logo to showcase the company's core service offerings of auto, fire, and life.  The new logo was introduced January 1, 2012, in celebration of the company's 90th anniversary. It consists of a simple three-oval design adjacent to the State Farm wordmark. According to Pam El, marketing vice president at State Farm, a change in image was needed to employ a bolder presence that could compete in today's digital world.

CEOs

Subsidiaries 

State Farm Mutual Automobile Insurance Company is the parent company of several wholly owned State Farm subsidiaries:
 State Farm Fire and Casualty Company
 State Farm Life Insurance Company
 State Farm Life and Accident Assurance Company 
 State Farm County Mutual Insurance Company of Texas 
 State Farm Mutual Insurance Company of Texas 
 State Farm Indemnity Company / State Farm Guaranty Insurance Company 
 State Farm General Insurance Company 
 State Farm Florida Insurance Company 
 Dover Bay Specialty Insurance Company
 State Farm Lloyds 
 State Farm Bank, F.S.B.
 State Farm Investment Management Corp. (SFIMC)
 State Farm VP Management Corp. (SFVPMC)
 State Farm International Service, Inc.
 State Farm Associate's Funds Trust
 State Farm Mutual Fund Trust
 SF Insurance Placement Corporation of Canada
 Insurance Placement Services, Inc.
 State Farm International Life Insurance Company Ltd.
 Plaza One Realty Co.
 State Farm Specialty Insurance Company
 State Farm Guaranty Insurance Company
 State Farm Variable Product Trust
 HiRoad Assurance Company
 Amberjack Ltd. (Real Estate)

Former

 State Farm Insurance of Canada – Based in Aurora, Ontario, was transferred to Desjardins Insurance in 2015 and completed by 2019. State Farm Finance Corporation Canada and State Farm Investor Services Canada Co. will merge into Desjardins as well.

Marketing and promotions

Jingle 
The State Farm jingle ("Like a good neighbor, State Farm is there") was written by American singer-songwriter Barry Manilow in 1971. A cover was released by Weezer in 2011. State Farm's first commercial jingle was created for The Jack Benny Program in the 1960s.

Television ads
In June 2011, State Farm's premiered its "Get to a Better State" campaign. This campaign focuses on making humor out of unfortunate problems that are commonly faced. These commercials then make light of the situation by demonstrating how easy it is to contact an agent and correct the problem that has occurred. Each of these commercials follows a similar structure. A group of one to three people find themselves in an unfortunate situation. Someone in the group will then call on their State Farm agent by singing the jingle “like a good neighbor, State Farm is there”. A State Farm agent will then appear, as if by magic, and help the group out with their problem. There are a few commercials that deviate from this structure, but still follow the same ultimate pattern.

Also in 2011, State Farm premiered its "State of..." advertising campaign. One notable commercial, "State of Unrest", shows a man awake at 3:00 in the morning on the phone with a State Farm representative. The man's wife sees him talking on the phone in a secretive manner. She is suspicious and asks who is on the phone, to which her husband says: "It's Jake from State Farm" (the original Jake from State Farm was portrayed by Jake Stone, who actually worked for the company). The man's wife then takes the phone and asks, "What are you wearing, 'Jake from State Farm?'", to which the male agent responds in a timid way, "Uh, khakis". The undaunted wife says, "She sounds hideous", and the husband replies, "Well she's a guy, so…" In May 2015, a variation of "State of Unrest" premiered, starring The Coneheads from Saturday Night Live, with Dan Aykroyd and Jane Curtin reprising their respective roles as Beldar and Prymaat. This ad series later added Laraine Newman as Connie.

In late 2014, State Farm released a critically acclaimed commercial showing a man (played by Justin Bartha) who says that he will "never" do something (such as getting married, having kids, moving to the suburbs, and buying a minivan), only to do all of those. At the end of the commercial, he admits that he is "never letting go." The commercial is based on the saying "never say never" and how people say that they will "never" do something, only to do it anyway.

In 2015, State Farm released The Hoopers, a series of State Farm commercials focusing on a family, including NBA players Chris Paul playing the father, DeAndre Jordan playing the mother, Kevin Love playing the son, Kevin Garnett playing the grandfather and Damian Lillard playing the baby. Additionally, a State Farm agent plays the role of a helpful neighbor in the set of commercials.

In 2020, Kevin Miles took over the role of Jake from State Farm from Jake Stone in a series of commercials, the first ad airing before Super Bowl LIV, as a reimagining of the original 2011 "State of Unrest" commercial from the "State of..." campaign. Craig Miller of State Farm's agency The Marketing Arm said the character was so popular people were still dressing as him for Halloween. Jake from State Farm, who wears a red shirt and khakis, appeared in different settings, including a beekeeper outfit and a parody of The Bachelorette, and in a number commercials with celebrities, including Alfonso Ribeiro, Chris Paul, Aaron Rodgers and Paul Rudd. On his first anniversary as Jake, Miles appeared in a commercial during Super Bowl LV in which Drake appeared as his stand-in. According to Marketing Arm, Jake is better known than Katie Couric or Hilary Swank and 80 percent of those who know him like him.

Sponsorships 

 State Farm Stadium, a football stadium in Glendale, Arizona, and home of the Arizona Cardinals of the National Football League.
 State Farm Arena, a multi-purpose arena and home of the Atlanta Hawks of the National Basketball Association.
 State Farm Center, a multi-purpose arena and home of the University of Illinois at Urbana–Champaign men's and women's basketball teams.
 State Farm Classic, a golf tournament for professional female golfers that is part of the LPGA Tour.
 State Farm Hall, a classroom building at Illinois Wesleyan University in Bloomington, Illinois.
 State Farm Hall of Business, College of Business Building at Illinois State University in Normal, Illinois, since 2010.
 State Farm Holiday Classic, an annual high school holiday basketball tournament held in Bloomington-Normal, Illinois each December.
 State Farm Lone Star Showdown, moniker for all varsity athletics competitions between Texas A&M University and The University of Texas at Austin.
 State Farm Research and Development Center, a research extension of State Farm Insurance located at the University of Illinois at Urbana-Champaign.
 State Farm Sales Lab, a clinical sales training center at the University of Central Missouri, where the national State Farm Marketing and Sales Competition is held.
 State Farm Computer Lab, a computer networking and software development room at the Mansfield University of Pennsylvania, where State Farm has sponsored the purchase of the majority of the equipment.
 State Farm Territorial Cup Series, moniker for all varsity athletics competitions between the University of Arizona and Arizona State University.
 NBA Cares Charity Challenge presented by State Farm, a charity program hosted by the NBA.
 State Farm All-Star Saturday Night, skills competitions that feature NBA players.
 League of Legends Championship Series, the North American branch of the League of Legends Professional League
 Overwatch League, the professional e-sports league for Overwatch.
 All Elite Wrestling, an American professional wrestling promotion.

Services 
State Farm Safety Patrol – State Farm, in partnership with several U.S. highway authorities, operates a service called the State Farm Safety Patrol which provides free roadside assistance to stranded motorists on participating highways. When a driver calls the designated telephone number for the Safety Patrol, they will respond and provide the following services: fuel refills; radiator refills; engine oil refills. Most Safety Patrol personnel are also CPR and Automated External Defibrillator certified. They work to reduce accident rates, minimize the duration time of incidents, assist disabled drivers and remove road debris. Turnpikes which currently participate include, Florida's Turnpike in the State of Florida and the Pennsylvania Turnpike in the Commonwealth of Pennsylvania. In Ohio, State Farm–branded safety patrol vans service major highways in the Cincinnati, Toledo, Cleveland, Columbus, Dayton, Akron, and Canton areas on weekdays.

State Farm won the 2020 Webby Award for Services & Utilities in the category Apps, Mobile & Voice.

Controversies and viewpoints

Florida potential withdrawal 

In early 2009, the State Farm Florida subsidiary, the state's largest insurer, offered to withdraw from writing property insurance business in Florida after state regulators refused to approve a 47% property rate increase. State Farm said that, in Florida, it had paid out US$1.21 in claims for every dollar in premiums since 2000. Several other home insurers had pulled out of Florida as well; many homeowners used the Citizens Property Insurance Corporation run by the state government. State Farm has since decided to remain in Florida, although with a reduced amount of property policies.

In 2010, State Farm and Renaissance jointly formed DaVinci Reinsurance Ltd. which insured more than 3.5 million homes in 2010.

Criticism 
A 2007 investigation by CNN reported that major car insurance companies, including State Farm and Allstate Insurance, were increasingly fighting claims of those alleging injury.  Some injured parties argued these were unfair practices. State Farm and Allstate have denied these allegations. This followed on the heels of criminal investigations by the states of Louisiana and Mississippi, alleging that State Farm had wrongly denied claims stemming from Hurricane Katrina.
Plaintiff's attorney Richard F "Dickie" Scruggs later pleaded guilty in March 2008 for his role in trying to pay Judge Henry Lackey of Mississippi a US$50,000 bribe for a favorable ruling in a related case involving a US$26.5 million settlement after Hurricane Katrina.

Plaintiff lawsuits 
In 1993, Todd Hindin filed a lawsuit against State Farm for allegedly keeping a list of prominent lawyers referred to within State Farm as the "Jewish Lawyers List". Any claims made by clients of these attorneys were automatically forwarded to State Farm's fraud unit, potentially on the basis of the religion and national origin of the lawyers. These claims would then be neither settled nor paid. State Farm initially claimed that this was not a matter of discrimination, but of coincidence. Frank Taylor, an experienced economist on retainer for the Appellants, argued that though the states involved contained 2-5% Jewish populations, the list contained 14% religiously or ethnically Jewish lawyers. People who had worked for State Farm, including former Divisional Claim Superintendent Ron Middler, testified that the list was potentially used to screen the lawyers mentioned in the list. State Farm paid out $30 million to Todd Hindin and his clients for discrimination on the basis of religion and national origin.

Bad faith: Documents that Hindin uncovered would assist in another case in 2003, Campbell v. State Farm, in which State Farm had to pay out $145 million in punitive damages (later reduced by the U.S. Supreme Court) after acting in bad faith. State Farm had to pay damages to the families of two car crash victims for whom Campbell was responsible, despite originally informing him and his family "that their assets were safe, that they had no liability for the accident, that [State Farm] would represent their interests, and that they did not need to procure separate counsel".

Climate change
Under CEO Michael L. Tipsord, State Farm has announced a Green Mission to "lead by example" in environmental philanthropy. Ceres has found that State Farm invests millions of US dollars to finance energy companies. Others place State Farm's fossil fuel investments at US $22.4 million. State Farm was viewed as not considering climate change in their investments.

In order to rectify the situation and show its green credentials, State Farm has committed to reducing its greenhouse gas emissions by 50% by 2030.
80% of State Farm facilities now have an Energy Star score of 75% or higher; this is significantly above the average for Fortune 50 companies.

LGBT 
On May 24, 2022, State Farm ended its partnership with GenderCool, an organization that seeks to raise awareness of "transgender and non-binary youth", after receiving backlash from right-wing and conservative political figures and media outlets.

See also 

 List of United States insurance companies
 State Farm Downtown Building
 Desjardins Group
 Desjardins Insurance

References

External links 

 
 State Farm Research & Development Center at the University of Illinois

 
Mutual insurance companies of the United States
Auto insurance in the United States
Life insurance companies of the United States
Reinsurance companies
Insurance companies based in Illinois
Companies based in Bloomington–Normal
American companies established in 1922
Financial services companies established in 1922
1922 establishments in Illinois
Desjardins Group
Privately held companies based in Illinois
Property insurance companies
Insurance companies of the United States